The 1971 Haringey Council election took place on 13 May 1971 to elect members of Haringey London Borough Council in London, England. The whole council was up for election and the Labour party gained overall control of the council.

Election result

|}

Ward results

Alexandra-Bowes

S. R. Gaubert was a sitting councillor for Noel Park ward.

Bruce Grove

Central Hornsey

G. C. Cleaver was a sitting councillor for Coleraine ward.

Coleraine

Crouch End

Fortis Green

Mrs C. J. Levinson was a sitting councillor for Central Hornsey ward.
G. J. Y. Murphy was a sitting councillor for Turnpike ward.

Green Lanes

High Cross

Highgate

Muswell Hill

Noel Park

M. S. Hiller was a sitting councillor for Coleraine ward.

Park

Seven Sisters

South Hornsey

South Tottenham

Stroud Green

Miss C. D. Jackson was a sitting councillor for Central Hornsey ward.

Tottenham Central

Town Hall

Turnpike

West Green

Mrs E. M. Donno was a sitting councillor for Seven Sisters ward.

References

1971
1971 London Borough council elections